Thomas Carl Thompson (November 7, 1889 – January 16, 1963) was a Major League Baseball pitcher. Thompson played for the New York Highlanders in the  baseball season. In seven career games, he had a 0–2 record, with a 6.06 ERA. He batted and threw right-handed. Thompson was born in Spring City, Tennessee and died in LaJolla, California.

He was the elder brother of Homer Thompson, who played in one game for the Highlanders in 1912.

External links
Career statistics and player information from Baseball Reference, or Baseball Reference (Minors), or Retrosheet

1889 births
1963 deaths
Atlanta Crackers players
Baseball players from Tennessee
Birmingham Barons players
Georgia Bulldogs baseball players
Jersey City Skeeters players
Major League Baseball pitchers
New York Highlanders players
People from Spring City, Tennessee
Sportspeople from Tennessee